Kouadio Pascal Doubaï''' (born 22 May 1992 in Yamoussoukro), is a former Ivorian footballer. He last played for BSC Young Boys in the Swiss Super League. He plays in the midfield, as either a central midfielder or an attacking midfielder.

Career
Doubai made his debut for BSC in the 4-0 routing of fellow Swiss Super League club AC Bellinzona.

Personal life
He is the younger brother of Thierry Doubai, who made 77 appearances for BSC.

References

 

1992 births
Living people
People from Yamoussoukro
Ivorian footballers
BSC Young Boys players
Swiss Super League players
Ivorian expatriate footballers
Expatriate footballers in Switzerland
Ivorian expatriate sportspeople in Switzerland
Association football midfielders